Nina Aleksandrovna Yevteyeva (born 24 November 1982 in Omsk) is a Russian short track speed skater. She competed at the 2002 Winter Olympics and 2010 Winter Olympics.

External links 
 

1982 births
Living people
Russian female short track speed skaters
Olympic short track speed skaters of Russia
Short track speed skaters at the 2002 Winter Olympics
Short track speed skaters at the 2010 Winter Olympics
Sportspeople from Omsk
21st-century Russian women